Gintaras Jasinskas (born 28 January 1968) is a Lithuanian biathlete. He competed at the 1992 Winter Olympics and the 1994 Winter Olympics.

References

External links
 

1968 births
Living people
Lithuanian male biathletes
Olympic biathletes of Lithuania
Biathletes at the 1992 Winter Olympics
Biathletes at the 1994 Winter Olympics
Sportspeople from Marijampolė